The 1961 Singapore Open, also known as the 1961 Singapore Open Badminton Championships, took place from 5 – 7 August 1961 at the Singapore Badminton Hall in Singapore.

Venue
Singapore Badminton Hall

Final results

References 

Singapore Open (badminton)
1961 in badminton